Bakunin (masculine) or Bakunina (feminine) is a Russian last name.

There are two theories regarding the origins of this last name. According to the first one, it is a variety of the last name Abakumov, which is derived from a patronymic, itself derived from various forms of the Christian male first name Avvakum. However, it is also possible that this last name is related to the last name Bakulin, both of which derive from dialectal Russian words "" (bakunya) and "" (bakulya), meaning, depending on the dialect, chatterbox, talkative person or agile, business-like person.

People with this last name
Mikhail Bakunin (1814–1876), Russian revolutionary anarchist
 Bakunin (biography), a 1937 biography of the anarchist by E. H. Carr
Alessandrina Bakunin, first wife of Italian economist Vilfredo Pareto
Alexey Bakunin (b. 1970), retired Russian association football player
Fyodor Bakunin (18981984), Soviet general
Kesha Bakunin, an author of dystopian fiction
Maria Bakunin (1873–1960), Russian-born Italian chemist and biologist
Yekaterina Bakunina, a subject of three paintings by Alexander Brullov, Russian Neoclassical artist
Yelizaveta Bakunina and her son Pyotr, ancestors of Prince George Alexandrovich Yuryevsky, Russian noble

Fictional characters
Herbert Bakunin, a character in Brave New World by Aldous Huxley
Mikhail Bakunin, a character in the American TV series Lost

See also
Bakunino, several rural localities in Russia

References

Notes

Sources
И. М. Ганжина (I. M. Ganzhina). "Словарь современных русских фамилий" (Dictionary of Modern Russian Last Names). Москва, 2001. 



Russian-language surnames